WTL or variation may refer to:

Transportation
 Whitley Bay Metro station (rail station code: WTL), North Tyneside, Tyne and Wear, England, UK
 Westall railway station (rail station code: WTL), Melbourne, Victoria, Australia
 Tuntutuliak Airport (IATA airport code: WTL; FAA id: A61), Bethel, Alaska

Companies
 Windflow Technology (stock ticker: WTL) New Zealand wind power company
 West Energy (stock ticker: WTL) Canadian energy exploration company
 WorldCall (stock ticker: WTL) Pakistani telecom company

Sports
 Warszawskie Towarzystwo Łyżwiarskie (WTL), a Warsaw team in the Polish Ice Hockey Federation
 Woodsball Tournament League, an outdoor forest paintball league; see woodsball

Other uses
 Windows Template Library, a Microsoft Windows programming library for Win32

See also

 
 
 WTI (disambiguation)
 WT1 (disambiguation)
 LWT (disambiguation)
 LTW (disambiguation)
 TWL (disambiguation)
 TLW (disambiguation)
 WLT (disambiguation)